The Locomobile Sportif was a vintage era luxury car model manufactured by the Locomobile Company of America.

Locomobile Sportif specifications (1926 data)
 Color – Optional
 Seating Capacity – Four
 Wheelbase – 142 inches
 Wheels – Wood
 Tires – 35” × 5” cord; or, 35” × 6.75” balloon on order
 Service Brakes – Four wheel: foot brake, contracting on rear; internal expanding on front
 Emergency Brakes – Hand brake: internal expanding on rear
 Engine  – Six cylinder, vertical, cast in pairs, 4½ × 5½ inches; head non-removable; valves in side; H.P. 48.6, N.A.C.C. rating
 Lubrication – Force feed and splash
 Crankshaft – Seven bearing
 Radiator – Cellular
 Cooling – Water pump
 Ignition – Delco, 12 volt, 2 spark
 Starting System – Two Unit
 Voltage – Twelve to Sixteen
 Wiring System – Single
 Gasoline System – Pressure
 Clutch – Dry multiple disc
 Transmission – Selective sliding
 Gear Changes – 4 forward, 1 reverse
 Drive – Spiral bevel
 Rear Springs – Three-quarter elliptic
 Rear Axle – Full floating
 Steering Gear – Worm and gear

Standard equipment
New car price included the following items:
 tools
 jack
 speedometer
 ammeter
 electric horn
 ignition theft lock
 automatic windshield cleaner
 demountable rims
 spare wheel
 power tire pump
 shock absorbers
 stop light
 inspection lamp and cord
 front bumper
 spare tire carrier
 rear view mirror
 cowl ventilator
 headlight dimmer
 clock
 closed cars have smoking case, vanity cases and dome light.

Optional equipment
The following was available at an extra cost:
 35” × 6.75” balloon tires

Prices
New car prices were available F.O.B. factory plus tax on the following models:
 Chassis – $6600
 Four Passenger Sportif – $7400
 Seven Passenger Touring – $7400
 Touring Limousine – $9500
 Brougham – $9990
 Victoria Sedan – $9990
 Enclosed Drive Limousine – $9990
 Cabriolet – $10250

See also
 Locomobile Company of America

References
 Source: 
Vintage vehicles
1920s cars
1910s cars
Luxury motor vehicle manufacturers
Luxury vehicles
Cars introduced in 1918